Shami Kandi (also Romanized as Sham‘ī Kandī) is a village in Owch Tappeh-ye Sharqi Rural District, in the Central District of Meyaneh County, East Azerbaijan Province, Iran. At the 2006 census, its population was 32, in 7 families.

References 

Populated places in Meyaneh County